Lobengula may refer to:

 Lobengula, king of the Northern Ndebele people
 Lobengula, a constituency in Zimbabwe
 Lobengula, a pet lion in South Africa